"Uh-Uh-Uh" is the first single by the Canadian Squires, written by guitarist Jaime Robbie Robertson, and produced by independent producer Henry Glover. It was released in 1964 on Ware Records. The song was a standard R&B number akin to what the group, who more frequently used the moniker "Levon and the Hawks" (and whom after the single flopped, used it permanently), was performing in clubs across Canada and the United States. Sung by pianist Richard Manuel, with backing vocals by drummer Levon Helm, it was backed by "Leave Me Alone", also penned by Robertson.

Both Ware and Apex Records versions are extremely scarce and valuable.

Personnel
Rick Danko – bass
Levon Helm – drums, backing vocal
Richard Manuel – piano, vocal
Jaime Robbie Robertson – guitar, harmonica

References

External links

1964 debut singles
1964 songs
Songs written by Robbie Robertson
The Band songs